Mad Foxes is a 1981 exploitation film directed by Paul Grau and produced by Erwin C. Dietrich. It was a Spanish and Swiss co-production, filmed in Barcelona.

Plot 
A wealthy playboy seeks violent revenge on the neo-Nazi biker gang that murders his family.

Cast

Critical reception 
Critics have called Mad Foxes "the ultimate exploitation movie" and "one of the nuttiest films ever." Australian film critic and editor of Senses of Cinema Alexandra Heller-Nicholas in her book Rape-Revenge Films: A Critical Study (2011) called the film a "brazenly incoherent mélange of kung fu, softcore porn, Nazi fetishism and bike film pegged loosely to a rape-revenge structure, albeit one caught in a garbled narrative loop".

Mad Foxes was featured on an episode Red Letter Media's "Best of the Worst" film review series, where the hosts strongly criticized it for its incoherent plot and copious sexual content, including a scene in which two characters appear to have sex in a urine-filled bathtub.

References

External links 
 

Rape and revenge films
Spanish films about revenge
1980s Spanish-language films
English-language Spanish films
English-language Swiss films
1980s English-language films
1981 films
1980s exploitation films
Nazi exploitation films
Outlaw biker films
1980s crime thriller films
Spanish crime thriller films
Swiss crime thriller films
Films shot in Barcelona
1981 multilingual films
Spanish multilingual films
Swiss multilingual films